Ottoway may refer to:

 Ottoway, South Australia, a suburb of Adelaide
 Ottoway, Virginia, United States

See also
 Ottaway (disambiguation)